Angelo Sanchez  is an American mixed martial artist fighting primarily fighting for King of the Cage.  Sanchez is a former KOTC Bantamweight and Interim Champion.

Mixed martial arts career
Sanchez made his professional debut on June 9, 2007, with a submission loss to Jerome Griego at Gladiator Challenge 65.

Sanchez won the KOTC Interim Bantamweight championship with a victory over Tony Hervey at King of the Cage: Badlands on December 6, 2008.  Sanchez was supposed to face the Bantamweight Champion Lazar Stojadinovic at that event, but Stojadinovic could not defend the belt due to injury.  Sanchez has defended that championship against Nathan Torrez and Donald Sanchez and was then awarded the actual KOTC Bantamweight Champion. Sanchez's second fight against Donald Sanchez unified the KOTC Bantamweight titles as, Donald Sanchez had been awarded the Interim title after defeating Stojadinovic in August 2009. He lost the KOTC Bantamweight title to Donald Sanchez at KOTC Honor on May 14, 2010.

Mixed martial arts record

|-
| Loss
| align=center| 12–6
| Gabriel Benitez
| Decision (unanimous)
| Triple A MMA 5
| 
| align=center| 3
| align=center| 5:00
| Albuquerque, New Mexico, United States
| 
|-
| Loss
| align=center| 12–5
| Desmond Green
| TKO (cut)
| Bellator 105
| 
| align=center| 2
| align=center| 1:04
| Rio Rancho, New Mexico, United States
| 
|-
| Loss
| align=center| 12–4
| Ray Borg
| Decision (unanimous)
| Triple A MMA 3
| 
| align=center| 3
| align=center| 5:00
| Albuquerque, New Mexico, United States
| 
|-
| Win
| align=center| 12–3
| Richard Schiller
| Submission (arm triangle choke)
| King of the Cage: Night Stalker	
| 
| align=center| 1
| align=center| 4:01
| Santa Fe, New Mexico, United States
| 
|-
| Win
| align=center| 11–3
| Jacob Clark
| Submission (armbar)
| KOTC: High Performance	
| 
| align=center| 2
| align=center| 2:08
| Santa Fe, New Mexico, United States
| 
|-
| Win
| align=center| 10–3
| Amross Teasaytwho
| Submission (armbar)
| KOTC: Underground 71  	
| 
| align=center| 1
| align=center| 2:08
| Cortez, Colorado, United States
| 
|-
| Win
| align=center| 9–3
| Daniel Armendariz
| Submission (triangle choke)
| KOTC: Adrenaline
| 
| align=center| 2
| align=center| 1:47
| Mescalero, New Mexico, United States
| 
|-
| Loss
| align=center| 8–3
| Donald Sanchez
| Decision (split)  
| KOTC: Honor
| 
| align=center| 5
| align=center| 5:00
| Mescalero, New Mexico, United States
| 
|-
| Win
| align=center| 8–2
| Richard Montano
| TKO (punches)  
| KOTC: Native Warriors
| 
| align=center| 2
| align=center| 4:20
| Santa Fe, New Mexico, United States
| 
|-
| Win
| align=center| 7–2
| Donald Sanchez
| Decision (split)  
| KOTC: Retribution II  	
| 
| align=center| 5
| align=center| 5:00
| Mescalero, New Mexico, United States
| 
|-
| Win
| align=center| 6–2
| Nathan Torrez
| Submission (armbar)  
| KOTC: New Breed 	
| 
| align=center| 1
| align=center| 3:58
| Mescalero, New Mexico, United States
| 
|-
| Win
| align=center| 5–2
| Tony Hervey
| Decision (split)   
| KOTC: Goodfellas
| 
| align=center| 5
| align=center| 3:00
| Albuquerque, New Mexico, United States
| 
|-
| Win
| align=center| 4–2
| Eric Buck
| TKO   
| Fightworld 16: International    	
| 
| align=center| 1
| align=center| 3:21
| Albuquerque, New Mexico, United States
| 
|-
| Win
| align=center| 3–2
| Mike Alirez
| Submission (armbar)   
| KOTC: Badlands
| 
| align=center| 2
| align=center| 2:54
| Albuquerque, New Mexico, United States
| 
|-
| Loss
| align=center| 2–2
| Matt Young
| Submission    
| Sky UTE Fighting  
| 
| align=center| 2
| align=center| 1:36
| Ignacio, Colorado, United States
| 
|-
| Win
| align=center| 2–1
| Carlos Lopez
| TKO   
| Desert Extreme: Toe 2 Toe 
| 
| align=center| 
| align=center| 
| New Mexico, United States
| 
|-
| Win
| align=center| 1–1
| David Valverde
| Submission (rear-naked choke)   
| KOTC: Hierarchy   
| 
| align=center| 1
| align=center| 1:45
| Albuquerque, New Mexico, United States
| 
|-
| Loss
| align=center| 0–1
| Jerome Griego
| Submission (rear-naked choke)   
| Gladiator Challenge 65: Global War   
| 
| align=center| 3
| align=center| 1:26  	
| New Mexico, United States
|

See also 
List of KOTC champions

References

External links

Living people
American male mixed martial artists
Year of birth missing (living people)